GuideOne Insurance is a niche-market insurer based in West Des Moines, Iowa, and is one of the largest church insurers in the United States. The company is licensed in all 50 states. As of year-end 2021, the company reached $1.06B in written premium.

The company celebrated its 75th anniversary on April 1, 2022. For more than 75 years, GuideOne has been recognized for its deep knowledge of niche businesses, strong relationships with partners and intellectual curiosity to keep the organization moving forward. Today, the company’s level of talent and knowledge makes it a larger, more sophisticated player in the marketplace than it was previously.

GuideOne Insurance appointed Adam Niebrugge to the position of senior vice president, chief actuary and risk officer, effective July 7, 2022. In this role, Niebrugge is responsible for leading GuideOne’s actuarial team and overseeing the company’s enterprise risk management strategies and its evaluation of financial risk exposures.

On July 5, 2022, AM Best, the largest credit rating agency in the world specializing in the insurance industry, affirmed the Financial Strength Rating of A- (Excellent) and the Issuer Credit Rating of “a-” of the GuideOne Insurance Companies. The outlook of these ratings is stable.

Bernard (Bernie) Hengesbaugh was named president and chief executive officer of GuideOne Insurance Company on June 15, 2022. Hengesbaugh is an industry veteran having served in multiple leadership roles at CNA Insurance. He took over for Andy Noga, who served as interim CEO for the past several months and returned to his role as general counsel of the company.

History 
1946– William N. Plymat  sent 10,000 letters to ministers and laymen asking their views on the idea of an insurance company that would insure only total abstainers from alcohol at lower rates than other carriers. The belief was that non-drinkers would be in fewer accidents than those that did drink. The company was established as America's first auto insurance company for nondrinkers.
Dec. 26, 1946 – Preferred Risk Mutual Insurance Company (PRM) was organized in Des Moines, Iowa, with $30,000 capital contributed by Plymat, J.J. Mallon and Reverend Sam Morris.  Morris, a popular radio host, was elected the first president of the company.
April 1, 1947 – Preferred Risk Mutual Insurance Company was licensed to operate in Iowa.
1948 – A "merit reduction" plan was introduced, which was the first of its kind in the country.  Policyholders received a 15 percent reduction in premium at their first annual renewal if they didn't file claims, with further reductions of 5 percent each year until a maximum of 40 percent was reached.
Sept. 1, 1948 – Midwest Mutual Insurance (MM) was formed to offer motorcycle coverage.
1962 – The company introduced America's first multiple-peril package policy for churches.
1968 – A new home office building was planned at 1111 Ashworth Road in West Des Moines.  The $2.5 million building received recognition from Administrative Management magazine as a finalist in the "Office of the Year" competition.  The company is headquartered at this location today.
1972 – The no-fault automobile insurance, introduced by PRM in 1969 as "Auto-Matic Pay" generated legislation at the state and national levels.  The Connecticut Legislature acted to make a similar plan mandatory throughout the state.  Today, some form of this policy is available to car owners everywhere, and the concept is universally recognized as a staple coverage in insurance packages.
1980 – The Preferred Risk family provided seed money to help establish MADD, Mothers Against Drunk Driving, as a national organization.
1990 – PRM provided MADD with a $2 million donation, their single largest contribution to date.
1998 – Preferred Risk changed its name to Guidant Mutual Insurance Company.
1999 – Preferred Risk changed its name to GuideOne Insurance to help create a more recognizable product and brand name.
1999 – GuideOne received the Integrity Award from the Iowa Better Business Bureau. 
2005 – GuideOne was selected as one of the "Principal 10 Best Companies for Employee Financial Security."
2011 – GuideOne was named to Ward's 50 Top Performing Insurance Companies.
2012 – GuideOne was named to Ward's 50 Top Performing Insurance Companies for the second year in a row.
2013 – GuideOne was named to Ward's 50 Top Performing Insurance Companies for the third year in a row.
2014 – GuideOne was named to Inc. 5000's list of the fastest growing private companies in the United States.  The Inc. 5000 is ranked according to percentage revenue growth over a three-year period. 
2016 - GuideOne becomes a commercial lines-only insurance company.
2017 - Jessica E. Snyder is named GuideOne's President & Chief Executive Officer.
2018 - GuideOne launches small business commercial insurance.
2019 - GuideOne National expands into new segment, Excess & Surplus (E&S) or Specialty Lines, focusing on three industry sectors: infrastructure, construction and energy.
June 2020 - GuideOne Insurance (GuideOne) has chosen One Inc Digital Payments System to modernize the incoming and outbound payment functionality of the company.
January 2022 - GuideOne Insurance (GuideOne) earned the Best in Class Employer designation from Gallagher’s 2021 Benefits Strategy & Benchmarking Survey. Only four other Iowa award winners claimed the honor by scoring in the top quartile of the nearly 4,000 large and midsize employers that participated in the national survey.

Corporate sponsorships 
The GuideOne Foundation supports many charitable organizations, including Big Brothers Big Sisters of Central Iowa, Courage League Sports, Food Bank of Iowa, Habitat for Humanity, Iowa State Fair, Junior Achievement of Central Iowa, and more.

See also 
 List of United States insurance companies

References 

Insurance companies of the United States
Companies based in Iowa
West Des Moines, Iowa
American companies established in 1947
Financial services companies established in 1947